Leave the Story Untold is the debut album by Belgian alternative dance band Soulwax, first released on May 10, 1996 and re-released a decade later once the band had found new fans with their work under the guise of 2ManyDJs.

The songs "Reruns (Daisy Duke)" and "Hammer & Tongues" were released on a limited edition white, 10" vinyl named 2nd Handsome Blues. This release also featured the songs "1-800" and "Cut Some Slack". The latter song was released on the Much Against Everyone's Advice bonus disc.

Track listing
"Intro"
"Reruns (Daisy Duke)"
"Caramel"
"Kill Your Darlings"
"Great Continental Suicide Note"
"Soul Simplicity"
"Rooster"
"Tales of a Dead Scene"
"Hammer & Tongues"
"Spending the Afternoon in a Slowly Revolvin' Door"
"About It Song"
"Long Distance Zoom"
"Vista Grande"
"Acapulco Gold"

References

1996 debut albums
Soulwax albums
PIAS Recordings albums
Albums produced by Chris Goss